Belchamber is a 1904 novel by Howard Sturgis.

Plot 
The story follows the life of Sainty, Marquis of Belchamber, from childhood to his mid-twenties. Sainty is shy, physically weak, likes knitting and dislikes sports. After much goading from his mother (Lady Charmington), he marries Cissy. However, she turns out to find him repugnant, and the marriage is unconsummated. Cissy later gives birth to a son, who Sainty realises is the result of an affair with his cousin Claude. Despite this, Sainty feels great love for the baby and is devastated when it falls ill and dies. As they grieve, Sainty and Cissy learn that an uncaring Claude has become engaged to someone else.

Literary significance and criticism
The novel received mainly poor reviews from readers and critics, although E.M. Forster deplored the lack of readership the book received. Edith Wharton, a personal friend of Sturgis', nonetheless praised the novel.  She described it as "very nearly in the first rank", and tried in vain to have the novel published by Scribner's before it was picked up by Putnam.

Bibliography

 Title: Belchamber
 Author:Howard Overing Sturgis
 Editor:	Ams PressInc, 1905
 , 9780404146139
 360 pages

References

External links

Podcast of an Edmund White interview about the book (August 2008)

1904 British novels